Wilma Rosbach Brown (August 7, 1921 – January 31, 2018) was an American politician in the state of Washington. She served the 20th district from 1979 to 1983. She operated a clothing store with her husband, Chuck in Chehalis, Washington. Rosbach died from cancer in January 2018 at the age of 96.

References

1921 births
2018 deaths
Businesspeople from Washington (state)
Republican Party members of the Washington House of Representatives
People from Chehalis, Washington
People from North Dakota
Women state legislators in Washington (state)
20th-century American businesspeople
20th-century American women
21st-century American women